The canton of L'Isle-Jourdain is an administrative division of the Gers department, southwestern France. Its borders were modified at the French canton reorganisation which came into effect in March 2015. Its seat is in L'Isle-Jourdain.

It consists of the following communes:
 
Auradé
Clermont-Savès
Endoufielle
Frégouville
L'Isle-Jourdain
Lias
Marestaing
Monferran-Savès
Pujaudran
Ségoufielle

References

Cantons of Gers